Dendrobium philippinense  is a species of orchid in the genus Dendrobium that is native to the Philippines, for which it is named, and also to the Island of Guam in the Micronesia.

References

External links
IOSPE orchid photos, Dendrobium philippinense Ames 1914, Photo courtesy of David Banks, Dr. E.F. de Vogel and Jaap Vermeulen and Their Netherlands National Herbarium Website. and Flora Malesiana Vol III

philippinensis
Orchids of the Philippines
Flora of Guam
Epiphytic orchids
Plants described in 1914
Flora without expected TNC conservation status